GNH may refer to:
 Greenhithe railway station, England
 Grey Nuns Hospital (disambiguation)
 Gross National Happiness
 Guru Nanak Home for Handicapped Children, Ranchi, India
 Lere language